Thom Anthony Walter Jonkerman (born 1 March 1998 in the Netherlands) is a Dutch footballer.

Career

In 2016, Jonkerman joined the Nike Academy in England after failing to make an appearance for Dutch second division side Dordrecht.

In 2017, he signed for Bristol Rovers in the English third division side after an unsuccessful trial with Arsenal, England's most successful club.

In 2017, he was sent on loan to Mangotsfield United in the English eighth division.

In 2018, Jonkerman was sent on loan to English seventh division outfit Cirencester Town.

In 2018, he signed for Lienden in the Dutch third division.

In 2019, he signed for Dutch second division team Eindhoven.

References

External links
 

Dutch footballers
Living people
Association football goalkeepers
1998 births
FC Lienden players
FC Eindhoven players